Born to Be may refer to:

 Born to Be (TV series), a documentary television series that aired on the Canadian music station MuchMusic
 Born to Be (album), a 1968 album by Melanie Safka
 Born to Be (film), a 2019 documentary film
 "Startin'/Born to Be...", a single by Ayumi Hamasaki
 Born to Be (book), a 1929 autobiography by Taylor Gordon

See also